The  is the second highest-ranking officer of the executive branch of the government of Japan after the prime minister of Japan, and ranks first in the line of succession to the prime minister. The office of the deputy prime minister is not a permanent position, and exists only at the discretion of the prime minister.

The deputy prime minister is appointed by the prime minister and must be a member of the cabinet, for instance Taro Aso served as Minister of Finance concurrently. Unlike the vice president of the United States, the deputy prime minister does not automatically become the prime minister, should the latter be incapacitated or resign, but instead exercises the duties of the prime minister until the National Diet elects a successor. However, when Prime Minister Tanzan Ishibashi resigned in 1957, then Minister for Foreign Affairs and Deputy Prime Minister Nobusuke Kishi (grandfather of Shinzo Abe and Nobuo Kishi) took the office of acting prime minister, and was officially elected by the National Diet a month later. Tarō Asō was the longest-serving deputy prime minister.

This position is currently vacant since 4 October 2021.

List of deputy prime ministers of Japan

References 

 Kenkyusha's New Japanese-English Dictionary, Kenkyusha Limited, Tokyo 1991, 

Politics of Japan